Nathan James Wilmot (born 13 December 1979) is a sailor, and a member of the Australian sailing team. He has won five world titles along with teammate Malcolm Page in the 470 class. They also won the Olympic test event in Qingdao in 2007 and were considered favourites to win the 470 event at the 2008 Summer Olympics. 

In the Beijing Olympic games they won convincingly on points leading into the medal race which they only had to finish to win first place. They won the finale race which secured them Olympic gold. They have been now classified as the most successful 470 competitors in history.

Although successful in the dinghy classes, he is an established ocean-racing yachtsman.

He was an Australian Institute of Sport scholarship holder.		

Wilmot comes from a sailing family. His father competed at the 1984 Summer Olympics and his uncle at the 1988 Summer Olympics. Uncle Hugh Treharne was tactician on the America's Cup syndicate, Australia II in 1983.

References

External links
 
 
 
 
 

1979 births
Living people
Australian Institute of Sport sailors
Australian male sailors (sport)
Sailors at the 2004 Summer Olympics – 470
Sailors at the 2008 Summer Olympics – 470
Olympic sailors of Australia
Olympic gold medalists for Australia
Olympic medalists in sailing
Medalists at the 2008 Summer Olympics
Extreme Sailing Series sailors
420 class world champions
World champions in sailing for Australia
470 class world champions
Recipients of the Medal of the Order of Australia